This is a list of the National Register of Historic Places listings in Perry County, Pennsylvania.

This is intended to be a complete list of the properties and districts on the National Register of Historic Places in Perry County, Pennsylvania, United States. The locations of National Register properties and districts for which the latitude and longitude coordinates are included below, may be seen in a map.

There are 23 properties and districts listed on the National Register in the county.

Current listings

|}

See also

 List of National Historic Landmarks in Pennsylvania
 National Register of Historic Places listings in Pennsylvania
 List of Pennsylvania state historical markers in Perry County

References

 01
Perry County
Buildings and structures in Perry County, Pennsylvania
Perry County, Pennsylvania